The Rohingya flag is the cultural and ethnic flag of the Rohingya people. Its use was first mentioned by Rohingya scholar and author A.F.K. Jilani, who documented its creation in the mid-20th century. On 20 May 2018, an updated version of the flag was created by the Rohingya Language Academy and released to the public; it is currently used by Rohingya diaspora communities around the world.

Design 
The flag design is a green field charged with a yellow coin containing white text. Green represents peace, gold represents prosperity, and white represents purity. The Arabic text on the coin is the shahada surrounded by the names of the Four Righteous Caliphs of Islam: Abu Bakar (top), Omar (bottom), Othman (left), and Ali (right).

Specifications

Colours

References

External links 
 Arakanese Rohingya Flag by the Rohingya Language Academy

Rohingya people
Flags of Myanmar
Flags of indigenous peoples